Steffen Klarskov Nielsen (born March 12, 1991) is a Danish ice hockey player for Rødovre Mighty Bulls and the Danish national team.

He participated at the 2017 IIHF World Championship.

References

External links

1991 births
Living people
Danish ice hockey forwards
People from Rødovre
Rødovre Mighty Bulls players
Frederikshavn White Hawks players
Aalborg Pirates players
Herning Blue Fox players
Sportspeople from the Capital Region of Denmark